The office of Leader of the Scottish Labour Party was established when the Scottish Parliament was formed in 1999 and prior to its inaugural election. Until the Murphy and Boyack review in 2011, the office was Leader of the Labour Party in the Scottish Parliament and restricted to members of the Scottish Parliament. Since the review, the office has been opened up to all elected Scottish Labour politicians, including those involved in the Parliament of the United Kingdom and local government.

List

Notes

References

Scottish Labour
Scottish Labour